The Roads and Transport Authority, commonly known as RTA, is the major independent government roads & transportation authority in Dubai, United Arab Emirates. It was founded in 2005 and is responsible for planning and executing transport and traffic projects, along with legislation and strategic plans of transportation in the city. It is a department of the Government of Dubai.

History
RTA was established in 2005 by Law No. 17 - 2005. It was launched by the Vice President and Prime Minister of the UAE, and Emir of Dubai, Maktoum bin Rashid Al Maktoum with the mission of developing integrated, sustainable and world-class transportation systems for residents of Dubai.

Administration system 
The RTA is led by Director General and Chairman of the Board of Executive Directors, Mattar Mohamed Al Tayer. The administration is divided into five different agencies or departments, each of which have their own directors and CEOs.

 Public Transport Agency
 Traffic and Roads Agency
 Rail Agency
 Licensing Agency
 Dubai Taxi

Metro, buses and trams ridership

RTA is a sole public transportation service provider which includes the Dubai Metro, Dubai Tram, Abras, Dubai Bus, Dubai Water Bus, Water Taxi and Dubai Ferry along with Dubai Taxi and its authorized taxi companies.
 
RTA operates approximately 1,442 buses on 107 routes, carrying almost 7 million riders on roughly 179,000 trips a month by the bus service; however the Dubai Metro is a driverless, fully automated metro rail system installed ubiquitously throughout the city. All trains and stations are air conditioned and equipped with and platform edge screen doors. The metro is divided into two lines, Red and Green; both lines together recorded a ridership of 164.3 million in 2014 as compared to 137.759 million in 2013 and 109.491 million in 2012.

RTA launched a sophisticated automatic bus passenger counting system known as "Rasid" in 2015. The total ridership of Dubai's public transport reached 531.350 million in 2014.

Some of the buses are electric. And some have robotic drivers.

Services and technology 
RTA uses one of the most advanced and smartest technologies in the world for residents of Dubai. It has officially launched a mobile app for all services mentioned below.

 Nol Card
 Smart Drive
 Public transport
 Dubai Drive
 Smart parking
 Smart taxi
 Smart Salik
 RTA Dubai
 Wojhati
 RTA corporate service app

See also

 Dubai Tram
 Dubai Metro
 Nol Card
 Salik
 Transportation in Dubai
 List of roads in Dubai

References

External links
 Roads and Transport Authority official website
 Salik official Website
  All About Dubai Bus Timings, Routes & Fare

 
Dubai Metro
Underground rapid transit in the United Arab Emirates
2005 establishments in the United Arab Emirates
Government agencies of Dubai